Jonathan Kahn is professor of law at Mitchell Hamline School of Law and former James E. Kelley Chair in Tort Law. He is the author of  Race on the Brain: What Implicit Bias Gets Wrong About the Struggle for Racial Justice (2017) and Race in a Bottle: The Story of BiDil and Racialized Medicine in a Post-Genomic Age (2013).

Selected publications

References

Further reading
Curriculum vitae

Living people
21st-century American lawyers
Mitchell Hamline School of Law faculty
Yale University alumni
University of California alumni
Cornell University alumni
Year of birth missing (living people)